Trastevere is a 1971 Italian comedy film. This is the first and only film directed by actor and screenwriter Fausto Tozzi. The film was heavily cut by producer Alberto Grimaldi, who cut the roles of Umberto Orsini, Martine Brochard, and Riccardo Garrone.

Cast
Nino Manfredi: Carmelo Mazzullo
Rosanna Schiaffino: Caterina Peretti aka Rama
Vittorio Caprioli: Don Ernesto
Ottavia Piccolo: Nanda
Vittorio De Sica: Enrico Formichi
Leopoldo Trieste: The professor
Mickey Fox (as Mikey Fox): Sora Regina
Milena Vukotic: Delia, wife of professor
Gigi Ballista: The count
Ronald K. Pennington (as Ronald Kerry Pennington): Kerry
Luigi Uzzo: Cesare
Lino Coletta: Alvaro Diotallevi
Don Powell: John
Rossella Como: Teresa, the prostitute
Fiammetta Baralla (as Fiammetta): Gigliola, other prostitute
Enzo Cannavale: Straccale'
Nino Musco: The sergeant
Luigi Valanzano: The Barman
Lino Murolo: The policeman
Luciano Pigozzi: Angry man
Franca Scagnetti: Woman near other angry man
Vittorio Fanfoni: Pierre
Stefano Oppedisano: Gaston
Leonardo Benvenuti: Officier of GdF (uncredited)
Nerina Montagnani: Sora Rosa (uncredited)

References

External links

1971 films
Italian comedy-drama films
1971 comedy-drama films
Films set in Rome
Commedia all'italiana
Films scored by Guido & Maurizio De Angelis
Films produced by Alberto Grimaldi
1971 comedy films
1971 drama films
1970s Italian films